I-25 & Broadway station (sometimes stylized as I-25•Broadway) is a three-platform RTD light rail station in Denver, Colorado, United States. Operating as part of the D, E  and H Lines, the station was opened on October 8, 1994, and is operated by the Regional Transportation District. As the name implies, the station is located at the interchange between Interstate 25 and Broadway in south-central Denver. It is the major transfer point for commuters traveling from Littleton and Englewood on the Southwest Line to the Denver Technological Center on the Southeast Lines.

When the system was first opened in 1994, I-25 & Broadway was the southern terminus for the Central Line, at that time built in the lone corridor in the system. Since then, three new corridors have been constructed. I-25 & Broadway Station is becoming a focal point of a new transit-oriented development on the site of the old Gates Rubber Company factory, just south, east and west of the station.

Service of lines
Tracks in this station are laid out in a wye. Trains originating at the yard south of Evans Station and bound for the Southeast Line bypass I-25 & Broadway platforms, but operate in service from Evans Station. Trains returning to the yard do not operate in service. I-25 & Broadway is the southernmost transfer station for all lines leading north toward the 10th & Osage station.

Gallery

References

RTD light rail stations in Denver
Railway stations in the United States opened in 1994
1994 establishments in Colorado